DK Company is a clothing company based in Ikast, Denmark.

History
DK Company was established in 2001 by Jens Poulsen.  With its own brand, Jasmin, and private label production for external fashion labels.

In 2012, DK Company acquired three divisions from BTX Group: the Young division (Blend, FQ1924, ICHI, Gestuz, and Blend She), the Modern division (Fransa, b.young, Dranella, and Veto), and the Modern division (Modern).

In 2014, DK Company acquired four brands from IC Group: InWear, Matinique, Part Two, and Soaked in Luxury 

In 2019, DK Company acquired the brand  Saint Tropez. The brand was integrated into the Copenhagen office.

Brands
DK Company covers 23 brands
 Blend
 BON'A PARTE
 b.young
 Casual Friday
 Cream
 Culture
 Dranella
 fransa
 FQ 1924
 Gestuz
 ICHI
 InWear
 KAFFE, and KAFFE curve
 Karen by Simonsen
 Lounge Nine
 Matinique
 Part Two
  Saint Tropez
 Soaked in Luxury
 !Solid

References

External links
 Official website

Clothing companies of Denmark
Clothing companies based in Copenhagen
Clothing companies established in 2001
Danish companies established in 2001